Dan O'Brien (born May 16, 1963) is an American college football coach and administrator. He is currently the Senior Associate Athletic Director for Football at the University of Minnesota in Minneapolis, Minnesota.

O'Brien has served in a number of administrative roles at the University of Minnesota, Hamline University, and Concordia University of St. Paul. He was the head football coach of the Concordia Golden Bears from 1998 to 1999, compiling a record of 7–13 while ushering the team into NCAA Division II status.

Head coaching record

College

References

External links
 Concordia Hall of Fame profile

1963 births
Living people
Concordia Golden Bears athletic directors
Concordia Golden Bears football coaches
Hamline Pipers athletic directors
High school football coaches in Minnesota